Ee Jeeva Ninagagi is a 1986 Indian Kannada-language romantic drama film, directed by V. Somashekhar and produced by Vijaya Shankar Bhat. The film stars Vishnuvardhan, Urvashi, Baby Shalini and Lokanath. The film has musical score by Vijayanand. Vasu who wrote story for this film remade it in Tamil as Amma Vandhachu.

Cast 

Vishnuvardhan
Urvashi
Baby Shalini
Lokanath
N. S. Rao
Mysore Lokesh
Bangalore Nagesh
Thimmayya
Karanth
Shani Mahadevappa
Sarigama Viji
B. K. Shankar
Thipatur Siddaramaiah
Chandrashekar
Sampangi
Chikkanna
Muniraju
Master Rajesh
Pramila Joshai
Shashikala
Shamala
Kokila
Lalithamma
Sathyabhama
Seema
Hemanalini
Srivani
Baby Nandini
Baby Pramodini
Dinesh in Guest Appearance
Jai Jagadish in Guest Appearance
Sudheer in Guest Appearance
Mukhyamantri Chandru in Guest Appearance

Soundtrack 
Soundtrack was composed by Vijayanand.

References

External links 
 
 

1986 films
1980s Kannada-language films
Indian drama films
Kannada films remade in other languages
Films directed by V. Somashekhar
Films scored by Vijayanand